Synanthedon sapygaeformis, the Florida oakgall moth, is a species of clearwing moth in the family Sesiidae.

The MONA or Hodges number for Synanthedon sapygaeformis is 2573.

References

Further reading

External links

 

Sesiidae
Moths described in 1856